Abderites or Abderite may refer to:

People associated with the ancient city of Abdera, Thrace
Adherents of the philosophical school of Abdera
Abderite, a reference to Democritus, native of Abdera; later acquired the generic meaning of "scoffer" 
Abderites, archetypical fools in classical Greece, akin of the Wise Men of Gotham
The satirical book Die Abderiten, eine sehr wahrscheinliche Geschichte by Christoph Martin Wieland
 Abderites (mammal), a genus of Paucituberculata from South America